Glandular branches can refer to:
 Glandular branches of facial artery (rami glandulares arteriae facialis)
 Glandular branches of the superior thyroid artery (rami glandulares arteriae thyroideae superioris)
 Glandular branches of the inferior thyroid artery (rami glandulares arteriae thyroideae inferioris)